Linkmenys is a village located in Ignalina District Municipality in Utena County, Lithuania. According to the 2011 census, the village had a population of 134 inhabitants.

History 
Around 1500, the local church has been erected. Sigismund Augustus had a manor and a town which belonged to the manor in Linkmenys. In 1922, 2 years after Polish-Lithuanian War, the Polish soldiers in Lithuanian school of Linkmenys butted the Vytis as "foreign state sign".

During the interwar period, the village was split with Polish-Lithuanian demarcation line, however the bigger part of the village was annexed by Poland.

During World War II, in mid-July 1941, 70 Jewish men, women and children were murdered in a mass execution perpetrated by an Einsatzgruppen and Lithuanian collaborators. A memorial stone is erected at the site of the massacre.

Notable people 
 Ignacy Oziewicz, Polish military officer

References 

Villages in Utena County
Sventsyansky Uyezd
Wilno Voivodeship (1926–1939)
Holocaust locations in Lithuania
Ignalina District Municipality